Ubaldina Valoyes Cuesta (born July 6, 1982 in Quibdó, Chocó) is a female weightlifter from Colombia. She won a gold medal at the 2007 Pan American Games for her native South American country. Valoyes has represented Colombia at the Summer Olympics three times: in 2004, 2008 and 2012. She won the – 75 kg gold medal in snatch and clean & jerk during the 2014 Pan American Sports Festival.

References

External links
 sports-reference

1982 births
Living people
Olympic weightlifters of Colombia
Weightlifters at the 2003 Pan American Games
Weightlifters at the 2007 Pan American Games
Weightlifters at the 2011 Pan American Games
Weightlifters at the 2004 Summer Olympics
Weightlifters at the 2008 Summer Olympics
Weightlifters at the 2012 Summer Olympics
Weightlifters at the 2016 Summer Olympics
Sportspeople from Chocó Department
Colombian female weightlifters
Weightlifters at the 2015 Pan American Games
Pan American Games gold medalists for Colombia
Female powerlifters
Pan American Games medalists in weightlifting
Central American and Caribbean Games gold medalists for Colombia
Competitors at the 2006 Central American and Caribbean Games
South American Games gold medalists for Colombia
South American Games medalists in weightlifting
Competitors at the 2010 South American Games
Central American and Caribbean Games medalists in weightlifting
Medalists at the 2007 Pan American Games
Medalists at the 2011 Pan American Games
Medalists at the 2015 Pan American Games
Pan American Weightlifting Championships medalists
20th-century Colombian women
21st-century Colombian women